Bayou Pierre may refer to:

Bayou Pierre (Louisiana)
Bayou Pierre (Mississippi)